In military terms, 1st Brigade may refer to:

Australia
 1st Brigade (Australia)
1st Light Horse Brigade

Belgium
 1st Belgian Infantry Brigade
 1st Brigade (Belgium)

Canada
 1st Canadian Armoured Brigade
 1 Canadian Mechanized Brigade Group
 1st Canadian Tank Brigade

Croatia
 1st Guards Brigade (Croatia)

Czechoslovakia
 1st Czechoslovak Armoured Brigade

Estonia
1st Infantry Brigade (Estonia)

France
 1st Cavalry Brigade (France)
 1st Mechanised Brigade (France)

Germany
 1st Airmobile Brigade (Bundeswehr)

Israel
 Golani Brigade

Japan
 1st Airborne Brigade (Japan)
 1st Cavalry Brigade (Imperial Japanese Army)
 1st Helicopter Brigade

Poland
 1st Armoured Brigade (Poland)
 1st Brigade, Polish Legions
 1st Independent Parachute Brigade (Poland)

New Zealand
1st Infantry Brigade (New Zealand)

Romania
 1st Logistics Brigade (Romania)
 1st Surface to Air Missiles Brigade (Romania)

South Africa
 1st Infantry Brigade (South Africa)

Spain
 1st Mixed Brigade

Ukraine
 1st Tank Brigade (Ukraine)

United Kingdom
 1st Artillery Brigade (United Kingdom)
 1st Airlanding Brigade (United Kingdom)
 1st Army Tank Brigade (United Kingdom)
 1st Armoured Brigade (United Kingdom)
 1st Armoured Infantry Brigade (United Kingdom)
 1st Armoured Reconnaissance Brigade (United Kingdom)
 1st Assault Brigade Royal Engineers
 1st Cavalry Brigade (United Kingdom)
 1st Composite Mounted Brigade
 1st Gibraltar Brigade
 1st Guards Brigade (United Kingdom)
 1st London Infantry Brigade
 1st Malaya Infantry Brigade
 1st Mechanised Brigade (United Kingdom)
 1st Motor Machine Gun Brigade
 1st Mounted Brigade (United Kingdom)
 1st Parachute Brigade (United Kingdom)
 1st Special Service Brigade
 1st Signal Brigade (United Kingdom)

Artillery units
 1st Brigade Royal Field Artillery
 I Brigade, Royal Horse Artillery 
 I Brigade, Royal Horse Artillery (T.F.), Territorial Force
 I Indian Brigade, Royal Horse Artillery

United States
 1st Air Cavalry Brigade, 1st Cavalry Division (United States)
 1st Brigade, 1st Infantry Division (United States)
 1st Brigade, 1st Cavalry Division (United States)
 1st Brigade, 101st Airborne Division (United States), see 327th Infantry Regiment (United States)
 1st Brigade Combat Team, 10th Mountain Division (United States)
 1st Brigade, 7th Infantry Division (United States)
 1st Brigade, 24th Infantry Division (United States)
 1st Brigade, 104th Division (United States)
 1st Marine Expeditionary Brigade (United States)
 1st Provisional Marine Brigade
 1st Sustainment Brigade (United States)

See also
 1st Cavalry Brigade (disambiguation)